Michael Jakubo (pronounced "JACK-u-bo"; born November 17, 1982 in Sudbury, Ontario, Canada) is a Canadian professional curler from Garson, Ontario. He is the skip of Team Jakubo, and competed in the 2014–15 World Curling Tour. He represented Northern Ontario at the 2005 Tim Hortons Brier and the 2009 Tim Hortons Brier.

Jakubo is employed as a chartered accountant with Edward A. Jakubo, CA. He was elected to Greater Sudbury City Council in the 2014 municipal election, representing Ward 7, and has served as chair of the council's finance committee. He announced in December 2021 that he will not run for reelection in the 2022 municipal election.

References

1982 births
Living people
Curlers from Northern Ontario
Sportspeople from Greater Sudbury
Greater Sudbury city councillors
Canadian sportsperson-politicians
Canadian male curlers